20th Century Masters – The Millennium Collection: The Best of The Temptations, Volume 1 – The '60s is a compilation album and part of the 20th Century Masters series released through Universal Music Group. It was released August 31, 1999. The collection spans the band's history from 1965 to 1969.

Critical reception

Stephen Thomas Erlewine of AllMusic writes, "Like most entries in Universal Music's Millennium Collection (previously the province of MCA Records), The Best of Temptations, Vol. 1: The '60s is a solid budget-line collection containing 11 of their biggest hits from the '60s."

Track listing

Musicians

The Temptations
Otis Williams
Melvin Franklin
Paul Williams
David Ruffin
Eddie Kendricks
Dennis Edwards

Production

Compilation Produced by Harry Weinger
Digital Compiled and Mastered by Suha Gur and Kevin Reeves
Production Coordination by Margaret Goldfarb
Art direction: Vartan
Design: Meire Murakami
Photography courtesy of Motown Archives

Track information and credits adapted the album's liner notes.

Charts

Year-end charts

References

1999 greatest hits albums
Temptations
Universal Music Group compilation albums
Motown compilation albums
The Temptations compilation albums